Feud is an adventure game designed by John Pickford for Binary Design and published in 1987 as the first game under the Bulldog Software label of Mastertronic. Versions were released for the Amiga, Amstrad CPC, Atari 8-bit family, Atari ST, Commodore 64, MS-DOS, MSX, and ZX Spectrum. The player takes on the role of the sorcerer Learic, and must fight his evil twin Leanoric.

Gameplay

The only real enemy is Leanoric. To achieve your objective, the player must collect many herbs scattered across the map and mix them in a cauldron to make offensive and defensive spells. The spells vary from fireballs and lightning to invisibility and even turning peaceful villagers into zombies. A compass indicates Leanoric's location.  Several of the herbs are found in a garden, tended by a gardener.  The gardener, though slow-moving, is also able to inflict damage on Learic.

Leanoric, as a non-player character, has to do the same thing, collecting herbs to mix in his cauldron before hunting you down in order to attack.

Development
After developing Zub, John Pickford went on to design a game that he wasn't going to program. This required designing the game on paper before development started and overseeing the work of a different programming team.

Reception
Reviewer "Ben" for CRASH wrote, "What a way to kick off a new label! Feud is completely brilliant. I love original games, so it is a real pleasure to see a cheapie that’s as ‘new’ in concept as this — and as playable." Robert Swan, in his favorable review for Atari User magazine, stated that the game has "fantastic graphics, great sound, addictive gameplay and plenty of action-packed screens." He also praised the game's low price.

References

External links
 
 The Pickford Brothers developers of Feud

1987 video games
Amiga games
Amstrad CPC games
Atari 8-bit family games
Atari ST games
Binary Design games
Commodore 64 games
DOS games
Mastertronic games
MSX games
Single-player video games
Video games about witchcraft
Video games developed in the United Kingdom
Video games scored by David Whittaker
ZX Spectrum games